Paris Bible is a term widely used to describe a Latin Vulgate codex copied in the 13th century. These bibles signalled a significant change in the organization and structure of medieval bibles and were the template upon which the structure of the modern bible is based.

Up to the beginning of the 13th century there was no single structure for the order of the biblical books, and it was often presented in 4 volumes. The Paris Bible was unique for its time, it was a pandect (complete single volume) with a uniform order, which is similar to the order of the modern Bible used today. Between 1230 and 1280 AD this bible was copied more frequently and spread more widely across Europe than any other copy of the Bible.

Common characteristics 
Paris Bible is the name given to bibles produced by scribes mainly in Paris and areas of Northern France although examples are believed to have originated in England and Italy. However, scholars caution that the term is used too broadly as it is often confused with the ‘pocket bible’ which is applied to bibles produced from the 12th century onwards. These were small enough to be carried in a saddle or travelling bag or indeed a pocket. Whilst the Paris Bible often shared this characteristic, the pocket bibles did not conform to the other features commonly present in the Paris Bible which was also produced in larger sizes, which marks it as not interchangeable with the term pocket bible.

However, this bible was different to its counterparts as it was often smaller than bibles used previously, making it easier to hold and carry, this led to it also being known as the portable bible. Moreover, being contained in a single volume was an innovation.

Scholars apply the term to bibles which possess a number of common characteristics. Each pandect contained the apocryphal books, 64 prologues mostly based on the commentaries of Jerome and an index of the interpretations of Hebrew names (IHN).  Whilst the thirteenth century bibles were divided into chapters, they were yet to include numbered verses. Each bible was arranged in the following style:
Octateuch
I-IV Kings
I-II Chronicles
Ezra
Nehemiah
II Ezra
Tobit
Judith
Esther
Job
Psalms
Sapiential Books (Proverbs, Ecclesiastes, The Song of Songs, Wisdom and Ecclesiasticus, the Prophets (Isiah, Jeremiah, Lamentations, Baruch, Ezekiel, Daniel and the minor prophets)
I-II Maccabees
New Testament
Gospels
Pauline Epistles
Acts
Catholic Epistles
Apocalypse

Paris Bibles were commercially produced, often with no owner in mind. This set them apart from the traditional breviaries and psalters which were usually commissioned by the owner, with a distinct design, including illustrations which reflected their family history and status. Whilst the bibles were still carefully copied and complete with decorated or historiated initials and pen flourishes in coloured ink, they were more aesthetically uniform. However, their portability made them popular with students of theology and friars from the Dominican and Franciscan orders.

Structure and format 
Examples of known Paris Bibles have been measured in the range of 50cm x 30 cm to 23cm x 16cm, although the latter is a very rare example.

Due to the smaller size of the codex a larger number of leaves was required, between 400-700. This number of leaves is in stark contrast to earlier medieval bibles which usually had no more than 150-200 leaves. In order to compensate for the new thickness scribes needed to reduce the thickness of the parchment used.  This was achieved by using calf skin produced north of the Alps which was able to be processed on both sides, whilst retaining its white colouring and quality, which is a signature of most Paris Bibles. It was impossible to detect the hair side from the flesh side on this vellum, making it an ideal parchment for the fine writing required on these smaller bibles.

The reduction in thickness of the vellum also required bookbinders to introduce sexternions rather than quarternions so that leaves did not come loose from the bound spine due to them being so thin.

Due to vast number of leaves in these larger codices tracking systems had to be introduced to allow the bookbinder and illustrators to keep track of the leaves in a quire. This featured sequences of letters throughout the quire. Each quire was also individually labelled, often with Roman numerals.

A two-column layout is almost always adopted for ‘Paris’ Bibles. The margins, which usually commanded over 40% of the space on a medieval manuscript was reduced to

provide more writing space. The length of the text was reduced through the use of common abbreviations, and the font size was reduced, often to 1 millimeter. The text was evenly spaced over 50-60 lines on each page.

A further difference introduced in the Paris Bible is the use of common running headers, using alternating red and blue ink to aid readers and chapter numbers.

Scholars have disputed the fact that all Paris Bibles were single volume manuscripts as several two volume bibles are still in existence. Several leading Book Historians have suggested that where there is evidence of highly decorated pages mid-way through a one volume bible it is evidence of a two-volume manuscript being rebound at a later date as one volume.

Readers and owners 
Bibles produced before 1230 were designed for medieval monks, priests and those members of the laity who were capable of reading Latin. However, they did not engage with its content as a written text, they mainly heard it being proclaimed to them during the Mass. The cycle of the Church and Orders of the differing monasteries had the order of reading designated to them annually, according to the liturgical canon.

The founding of a flurry of universities in the thirteenth century can be regarded as one of the major changes which determined how the Bible would change.  One of the often-heard comments of the Paris Bible is that it was designed for studying the newly introduced theology which raised questions about the Articles of Faith and the doctrine of the Church.. Mendicant Orders also created schools (studia) which had, at the heart of the education program, an academic study of the scriptures.  It was these changes which led to the desire to rearrange the format of the Bible in order that students, masters and preachers could retrieve information effectively. Adding reading aids like running headers and chapter numbers allowed readers to find the Books of the Bible and essential text.

References

External links 
 The Paris Bible Project
Biblical manuscripts